See Me is the fourth and the last studio solo album by Ronnie Lane. The album was released 18 years before Lane's death. Lane had previously been a founding member of Small Faces and Faces.

During the recording of Rough Mix, Lane's multiple sclerosis was diagnosed. Nonetheless he toured, wrote and recorded (with Eric Clapton among others) and in 1979 released another album, See Me, which features several songs written by Lane and Clapton. Around this time, Lane travelled the highways and byways of England and lived a 'passing show' modern nomadic life in full Gypsy traveller costume and accommodation.

Track listings
All tracks composed by Ronnie Lane; except where indicated
 "One Step" (Ronnie Lane, Alun Davies) – 3:34
 "Good Ol' Boys Boogie" – 3:31
 "Lad's Got Money" – 4:57
 "She's Leaving" (Lane, Alun Davies) – 3:41
 "Barcelona" (Lane, Eric Clapton) – 5:15
 "Kuschty Rye" (Lane, Kate Lambert) – 4:10
 "Don't Tell Me Now" – 2:52
 "You're So Right" – 2:22
 "Only You" – 4:03
 "Winning With Women" – 4:08
 "Way Up Yonder" (Traditional, arranged by Ronnie Lane) – 2:50

Personnel
 Ronnie Lane – lead vocals, bass, drums, guitar
 Alun Davies – guitar, rhythm guitar
 Charlie Hart – accordion, bass, fiddle, piano, strings
Additional musicians
 Eric Clapton – guitar
 Henry McCullough – guitar, piano
 Cal Batchelor – guitar
 Brian Belshaw – bass
 Chrissy Stewart – bass
 Bruce Rowland – drums
 Steve Simpson – fiddle, mandolin, strings
 Billy Livsey – organ, piano
 Carol Grimes – backing vocals

References

1979 albums
Ronnie Lane albums